Aurore is a Sino-French community portal for science and university  cooperation. It was created in 2009 by the Offices for Science and University of the Consulate-general of France in Shanghai, in partnership with the French Academy of Sciences. The Portal, was inaugurated on May, 21st of 2010, at the French pavilion of the Shanghai Expo 2010. The portal is available at www.aurore-sciences.org.

Presentation 
Aurore is an exchange platform created to bring together scientific research stakeholders. It is also an interactive database for Sino-French cooperation in research and higher education. The Portal has been developed by the Offices for Science and University of the Consulate-general of the Republic of France in Shanghai, in partnership with the French Academy of Sciences. It covers the fields of sciences, technology, social sciences, and humanities. The portal is available without cost and allows all the stakeholders involved in scientific research to register, identify appropriate partners, and set up cooperative activities.

Aurore's aim is to gather information on the cooperative activities of stakeholders, institutions, programs and research projects in France and China, in the field of science and technology. The platform also encourages the researchers to make contact and gather into thematic working groups or communities of practise.
In the long term, Aurore aspires to become the display window of research and scientific cooperation between China and France. Numerous researchers, belonging to the highest institutions and schools in France (CNRS, Inserm, Académie des Sciences, Ecole Nationale Supérieure des Mines, Conservatoire National des Arts et Métiers, Paristech, INRIA, Institut Pasteur, IRD, INRA...) have already joined the platform.

Goals 

The platform, which covers the fields of sciences, technologies, social sciences and humanities, has three main functions.

Information  
Aurore allows the identification of appropriate partners and the setting up of new cooperative activities, thanks to the network of research and teaching institutions in France and China. The Portal also gathers information on cooperative projects, participating institutions and researchers. Finally, Aurore provides a lot of useful information such as calendars of scientific events, calls for proposal announcements and availability of scholarships.

Communication  
Aurore aims to improve exchanges between French and Chinese researchers by publishing news about research and cooperation. The portal is also a true community network that is sustained by its members’ contribution.

Cooperation 
Aurore helps initiate contacts, animate research groups, and communicate more actively on projects. This platform aims to encourage researchers to build contacts and create thematic working groups.

Interface 

Aurore is a Sino-French bilingual portal, that gathers the following subsections:

News  
This new tab gathers news about Sino-French research, in order to highlight the current cooperative activity.   It is made up of four sections. The Agenda section provides information about events related to scientific news ; the Channel section presents profiles of famous figures in scientific research. The News section refers to scientific articles published by institutions and research organizations. Finally, the members’ papers section refers to the database of all the articles published by members.

Members 
This tab provides an inventory of all the members registered on the platform, and allows users to have access to their respective profiles including membername, research field and specialty, institution, and contact informations.

'Establishments'  
This tab presents the registered institutions (address, detailed structure, fields of excellence, etc.). The establishments are registered according to two criteria: geography (national and local origin), and type (university, research institute, hospital).

Cooperations  
This tab describes the cooperative projects, and the associated members and institutions.

Groups  
This tab facilitates exchanges between scientific communities by creating and animating working groups and discussion groups. It truly illustrates the forum function of the portal.

Stakeholders 

The platform involves different stakeholders from the world of research.

- The platform will allow researchers to identify partners from their respective research fields, access clear and organized information about research networks and French and Chinese research institutions. The platform will provide scientific news ; 
- Universities, centres, laboratories and research institutions will gain visibility, for their projects as well as for their institutional organisation ; 
- administrative and consular services linked to higher education and research : they have access to the complete data, and broadcast notifications and targeted information for French and Chinese scientific communities ; 
- central administration (Ministries, Académie of sciences, etc.) can get a broad vision of global cooperation and knowledge of stakeholders, institutions and programs.

Partnerships 

The platform also relies on a strong network of partners :

 French Academy of Sciences.
 Canal Académie
 Campus France
 Institut français

External links 
Official site
Consulate-general of France in Shanghai

Web portals
Organizations established in 2009